Edward Buggin (died 1590), of Clerkenwell, London, was an English politician.

He was a Member (MP) of the Parliament of England for Totnes in 1572.

References

Year of birth missing
1590 deaths
English MPs 1572–1583
Members of the Parliament of England (pre-1707) for Totnes
People from Clerkenwell